Iroro Tanshi (born ) is a Nigerian tropical ecologist and conservationist who studies the ecology and diversity of African bats. She is a co-founder of, the Small Mammal Conservation Organisation (SMACON), a Nigerian NGO, where she is Director of Research Programs and mentors students and peers in species conservation.

Education
Tanshi obtained a degree in Environmental Science and a master's degree in Environmental Quality Management at the University of Benin in Benin City, Nigeria. She then studied at the University of Leeds in England, where she obtained a Masters in Biodiversity Conservation before undertaking research with Tigga Kingston at Texas Tech University in the US, where she was awarded a PhD in 2021.

Career
Tanshi discovered the only population of the short-tailed roundleaf bat (Hipposideros  curtus) in Nigeria, near the Afi Mountain Wildlife Sanctuary, and saved it from extinction. Tanshi also protected Nigeria's largest colony of straw-coloured fruit bats (Eidolon helvum) from a government proposal to destroy their roost tree.

Tanshi was recognized for discovering bat species in Nigeria that were last seen 45 years ago. Her 'Zero Wildfire Campaign', engages local people to protect critical habitats for this bat species is yielding results and is helping bring back this species from the brink of extinction. 

In parallel with her work at SMACON, Tanshi works as a lecturer at the University of Benin.

Awards
In 2020, Tanshi won a Future for Nature award from the Future for Nature Foundation, in recognition of her pioneering work discovering bat species. She was the first African woman to win the award.

In 2021, Tanshi won a Whitley Award issued by the Whitley Fund for Nature.

References

External links
, video by Iroro Tanshi (2020)
Small mammal conservation organisation

Living people
1980s births
Nigerian scientists
Conservationists
Ecologists